William Charles Morris (March 14, 1920 – June 16, 1995) was an American basketball player known for his collegiate career at the University of Washington in the 1940s.

Career 
Morris was a two-time NCAA All-American in 1943 and 1944 as well as a two-time first-team all-Pacific Coast Conference. Known as "Battleship Bill" Morris, he set then-school records of 183 points in a single season and 439 for a career. After serving in World War II he served as an assistant coach at his alma mater. Morris then coached the Buchan Bakers of Seattle to the Amateur Athletic Union national championship.

Death 
Morris died of cancer on June 16, 1995 at age 75.

References

1920 births
1995 deaths
All-American college men's basketball players
American men's basketball players
United States Marine Corps personnel of World War II
Basketball players from Washington (state)
Deaths from cancer in Oklahoma
Guards (basketball)
People from Bremerton, Washington
Washington Huskies men's basketball coaches
Washington Huskies men's basketball players
United States Marine Corps officers